The  is part of Japan National Route 329 in Uruma, Okinawa. It goes through the cliffs south of Ishikawa via the Ishikawa Tunnel (石川トンネル) and a bridge, all built in the early 1990s.

National highways in Japan